This is an incomplete list of locomotives and multiple units used by the ONCF.

The list

 1 The SNCF CC 72000 have switchable gear ratios, a "slow" setting with high tractive effort for freight operation and a "fast" setting with low tractive effort for passenger trains
 2 This type is used for passenger trains, but does not supply head end power. Passenger trains always have an additional generator van for train power supply.

Sources
 Railfaneurope.net: ONCFM locomotives and trainsets
 Railfaneurope.net: ONCFM withdrawn classes

Stock used by ONCF
Stock used by ONCF
Rolling stock of Morocco
ONCF